Bawsey is a village and civil parish in the English county of Norfolk. The village sits astride of the B1145 Kings Lynn to Mundesley road that dissects North Norfolk west to east.

The village's name means 'Beaw's island'

For the purposes of local government, the parish falls within the district of King's Lynn and West Norfolk. It forms part of the North West Norfolk constituency in the House of Commons. Norfolk County Council is responsible for roads, some schools, and social services.

The church was dedicated to St James and has been in ruins since at least 1745. The building and its surrounding area were the subject of a live dig by the Time Team programme in 1998, they determined it started life as a monastic settlement before becoming the parochial church of Bawsey, also during the weekend dig, the Norman arch under the former central tower was restored after it had collapsed some years before.

War Memorial
The War Memorials for Ashwicken, Bawsey and Leziate are located in All Saint's Church, Ashwicken. It holds the following names for the First World War:
 Rifleman William Watson (d.1917), 11th Battalion, Rifle Brigade (The Prince Consort's Own)
 Private Robert J. Britton (1888-1916), 6th Battalion, Border Regiment
 Private Maurice G. Allison (d.1916), 1st (North Midland) Battery, Royal Garrison Artillery
 Private Thomas H. Reed (d.1916), 1st Battalion, Royal Norfolk Regiment
 Private Bertie E. Beales (1896-1918), 5th Battalion, Royal Norfolk Regiment
 Private William Newell (d.1917), 5th Battalion, Royal Norfolk Regiment
 Private Walter Law (1893-1918), 7th Battalion, Royal Norfolk Regiment
 Private Herbert Watson (d.1918), 9th Battalion, Royal Norfolk Regiment
 Private George Wilkin (d.1916), 9th Battalion, Royal Norfolk Regiment
And, the following names for the Second World War:
 Able-Seaman Raymond C. Powley (1922-1941), HMS Nile

References

Census population and household counts for unparished urban areas and all parishes. Retrieved 2 December 2005.

External links

Information from Genuki Norfolk on Bawsey.

Villages in Norfolk
King's Lynn and West Norfolk
Civil parishes in Norfolk